The 2018–19 Georgia bulldogs basketball team represented the University of Georgia during the 2018–19 NCAA Division I men's basketball season. The team's head coach was Tom Crean in his first year at Georgia. They played their home games at Stegeman Coliseum in Athens, Georgia as members of the Southeastern Conference.

Previous season
The Bulldogs finished the 2017–18 season 18–15, 7–11 in SEC play to finish in a tie for 11th place. As the No. 12 seed in the SEC tournament, they defeated Vanderbilt and Missouri before losing to Kentucky in the quarterfinals.

On March 10, 2018, the school fired head coach Mark Fox after nine seasons at Georgia. On March 13, the school hired former Marquette and Indiana coach Tom Crean to replace Fox.

Offseason

Departures

2018 recruiting class

Roster

Schedule and results

|-
!colspan=12 style=|Exhibition

|-
!colspan=12 style=| Regular season

|-
!colspan=9 style=| SEC Tournament

References

Georgia Bulldogs basketball seasons
Georgia